Jaroslav (also written as Yaroslav or Jarosław in other Slavic languages) is a Czech and Slovak first name, pagan in origin. Its feminine form is Jaroslava. 

There are several possible origins of the name Jaroslav. It is very likely that originally the two elements of the name referred to Jarilo - male Proto-Slavic deity of the sun, spring, and fertility, and slav meaning glory, i.e. "glory of the sun". However, with the adoption of Christianity in the Slavic countries the  name began to be commonly understood not as a reference to a pagan deity, but rather to the "fervent worship of God"1 of the Bible.

People named Jaroslav
Jaroslav Drobný, Czech tennis player
Jaroslav Drobný, Czech footballer
Jaroslav Filip, Slovak musician.
Jaroslav Foglar, Czech novelist
Jaroslav Halák, Slovak ice hockey player
Jaroslav Hašek, Czech author, writer of The Good Soldier Švejk
Jaroslav Heyrovský, Czech chemist and inventor, recipient of the Nobel prize
Jaroslav Jakubovič, Czech jazz saxophonist
Jaroslav Janiš, Czech race car driver
Jaroslav Janus, Slovak ice hockey player
Jaroslav Levinský, Czech tennis player
Jaroslav Mostecký (1963–2020), Czech fantasy writer
Jaroslav Naď, Slovak politician
Jaroslav Nešetřil, Czech mathematician
Jaroslav Pelikan, American Christian scholar
Jaroslav Pospíšil, Czech tennis player
Jaroslav Seifert, Czech poet, recipient of the Nobel prize
Jaroslav Špaček, Czech ice hockey player
Jaroslav Šrámek, Czechoslovak fighter pilot and military commander

Places
Jaroslav (Pardubice District), a municipality and village in the Czech Republic

See also
Jarosław (disambiguation)
Yaroslav (disambiguation)
Slavic names

Bulgarian masculine given names
Croatian masculine given names
Czech masculine given names
Russian masculine given names
Slovak masculine given names
Slovene masculine given names
Ukrainian masculine given names
Slavic masculine given names